Located in Kingston, Tennessee, Roane County High School or better known as  Kingston  is the largest of five high schools in Roane County. The school mascot is the Yellow Jackets. The school colors are navy and orange. Kingston is accredited by the Southern Association of Colleges and Schools and is a member of Tennessee Secondary Schools Athletic Association. or better known as TSSAA.

Athletics
The Kingston Yellow Jackets' football team hosts games at Dr. Nat Sugarman Memorial field. The football team won the state championship in 1973 (Class AA).  The Kingston golf team won the TSSAA Class A-AA State Championship back-to-back years in 1999 and 2000.

Notable alumni
 Charles Winters - Journalist
 Bowden Wyatt - College Football Hall of Fame as Player and Coach

References

External links
 
 Roane County Schools website

Public high schools in Tennessee
Schools in Roane County, Tennessee